Edith Eccles (born 1910 in Liverpool; died 1977) was a British classical archaeologist who did work at the British School at Athens and worked with Sir Arthur Evans at Knossos on Crete in the 1930s. She studied at Royal Holloway, University of London.

Career
During the 1930s she was a friend of Mercy Money-Coutts who worked and travelled with her in Greece and beyond. She remained active after the diagnosis of multiple sclerosis that ultimately ended her life.

In 1935, Eccles assisted the archaeologist Spyridon Marinatos with excavations at the cave sanctuary of Arkalochori. She maintained a strong professional relationship with Marinatos throughout her life, which is documented through letters published in 2015.

In 1936, Eccles attended Bryn Mawr College as the Mary Paul Collins Fellow in Archaeology. At that time, she worked on illustrations for Arthur Evans's publication of their excavations at Knossos. Eccles studied Greek Archaeology under Mary Hamilton Swindler, whilst researching gems and seal stones of the Late Minoan and Mycenean periods.

Selected works
Eccles, Edith. "The Seals and Sealings." Annual of the British School at Athens vol. 40(1940): 43–49. 
Hutchinson, R. W., Edith Eccles and Sylvia Benton. "Unpublished Objects from Palaikastro and Praisos. II." The Annual of the British School at Athens, vol. 40(1939): 38–59. .

References 

Classical archaeologists
Academics from Liverpool
Alumni of Royal Holloway, University of London
Deaths from multiple sclerosis
Neurological disease deaths in the United Kingdom
1910 births
1977 deaths
Bryn Mawr College alumni
English archaeologists
Minoan archaeologists
20th-century archaeologists
British women archaeologists